"Mama" is a song by American singer B. J. Thomas, released in March 1966 as a single from his debut album I'm So Lonesome I Could Cry. It peaked at number 22 on the Billboard Hot 100 and was later covered by British singer Dave Berry, whose version became a top-ten hit in the UK.

Background and release
"Mama" was written by Mark Charron and details the devotion of a son to their mother. It was B. J. Thomas' follow-up to his top-ten hit "I'm So Lonesome I Could Cry" and was produced by Huey P. Meaux, credited as his company Music Enterprises. The single was originally released in March 1966 on Meaux's label Pacemaker Records, but was later released in May 1966 on Scepter Records, whereupon it became a hit, reaching the top thirty in the US and topping the chart in Australia.

BIllboard described it as a "nostalgic easy-rocker with top Thomas vocal replaces his hit "I'm So Lonesome I Could Cry."", whilst Cash Box described it as a "haunting, easy-going praise-filled ode to all the mothers in the world."

Charts

Dave Berry version

English musician Dave Berry released his version as a single in June 1966 which became his final top-ten single. Berry also sang the song in the film The Ghost Goes Gear.

Reviewed in Record Mirror, "Mama" was described as "a slightly surprising selection – a well-sung and finely accompanied (by Ivor Raymonde) treatment of the ultra-sentimental song currently a big hit in the States via B. J. Thomas. As ever, Dave invests the song with a sense of style and drama." John Wells for New Musical Express described it as "a great performance of this plaintive number by a singer who seems jinxed as far as the British charts are concerned."

Charts

Other cover versions
In 1983, Brian and Michael with St Winifred's School Choir released a cover of the song as a single, which peaked at number 93 on the UK Singles Chart.

References

1966 songs
1966 singles
1983 singles
B. J. Thomas songs
Dave Berry (musician) songs
Scepter Records singles
Decca Records singles
Song recordings produced by Huey P. Meaux
Song recordings produced by Mike Smith (British record producer)
Songs about mothers